Courtney Taylor is the name of:

Courtney Taylor (gridiron football) (born 1984), professional football player
Courtney Taylor-Taylor (born 1967), born Courtney Taylor, musician
 Courtney Taylor (actress), star of "Prom Night III"

See also
 Courtenay Taylor (born 1969), American voice over actress